Kistler Creek is a  tributary of Maiden Creek in Berks County, Pennsylvania in the United States.

Kistler Creek and Ontelaunee Creek join in the community of Kempton to form Maiden Creek.

See also
List of rivers of Pennsylvania

References

Rivers of Pennsylvania
Tributaries of the Schuylkill River
Rivers of Berks County, Pennsylvania